Arcabuco is a town and municipality in the Ricaurte Province, part of the Colombian Department of Boyacá. The municipality borders Moniquirá and Gámbita in the north, Villa de Leyva and Chíquiza in the south, Cómbita in the east and Gachantivá and Villa de Leyva in the west.

Etymology 
The name Arcabuco comes from Chibcha and means either "Place of the intricate scrublands" or "Place enclosed by the hills".

History 
The area of Arcabuco in the times before the Spanish conquest was inhabited by the Muisca. Their territory was part of the Muisca Confederation, a loose collection of rulers. Arcabuco was part of the zacazgo, with the zaque based in Hunza.

Modern Arcabuco was founded on October 22, 1856 by Celedonio Umaña and Leopoldo Rodríguez.

Economy 
The economy of Arcabuco is centered around agriculture and livestock farming. Apart from the agricultural products potatoes and strawberries, the town is known as a large producer of almojábanas.

Climate
Arcabuco has a subtropical highland climate (Cfb) with moderate to heavy rainfall year-round.

Named after Arcabuco 
 Arcabuco Formation, Late Jurassic to Early Cretaceous dinosaur tracks-containing geologic formation

Born in Arcabuco 
 Cayetano Sarmiento, professional cyclist

Gallery

References 

Municipalities of Boyacá Department
Populated places established in 1856
Muisca Confederation
Muysccubun